Stacey Eugene Pickering (born July 12, 1968) is a politician and public official from Laurel, Mississippi, United States. Pickering has served as a Mississippi State Senator, as State Auditor of Mississippi, and as executive director of the Mississippi Veterans Affairs Board.

Background 
Pickering is a seventh-generation Mississippian, reared in the Hebron community of Jones County on the family dairy farm. He graduated from West Jones High School as a National 4-H scholarship winner and continued his education at Jones County Junior College. He furthered his educational career by earning a Bachelor of Arts degree from Samford University in Birmingham, Alabama, and a master's degree in marriage and family counseling in 1993 from New Orleans Baptist Theological Seminary.

Before serving in the State Senate, Pickering worked in the private sector as the director of governmental affairs and inside sales manager for Howard Technology Solutions, a division of Howard Industries in Laurel, Mississippi.

He serves as a chaplain in the Mississippi Air National Guard of the 186th Air Refueling Wing.

State Senate 

Pickering represented District 42, based in Jones County, in the Mississippi State Senate, to which he was elected in 2003, after incumbent state senator, Vincent Scoper, decided to retire.

State Auditor 
Pickering was elected state auditor in 2007, when he defeated the Democrat Mike Sumrall, 55 to 45 percent, in the general election. He was sworn-in on January 10, 2008. In 2011, Pickering received only third-party opposition as he defeated Reform Party nominee Ashley Norwood, 76 to 24 percent.

In June 2012, Pickering was honored with the National State Auditor's Association's "National Excellence in Accountability Award" for his work on accountability and oversight regarding the American Recovery and Reinvestment Act of 2009. In 2009, the United States Department of Defense honored him with a "Patriot Award" from its Mississippi Committee on Employer's Support of the Guard and Reserve (ESGR) in recognition of his extraordinary support of its employees who serve in the Mississippi National Guard and Reserve. Pickering received this same award again in May, 2013.

In 2014, Pickering received the David M. Walker Excellence in Government Performance and Accountability Award, a national award presented once every two years to three auditors from the public sector accountability community who represent federal, state, and local governments.

Pickering resigned in 2018.

2012 presidential campaign

Pickering served as the chairman of Mitt Romney's Mississippi campaign during the 2012 presidential campaign.

Mississippi Veterans Affairs Board
Pickering and Chief of Staff Melissa Wade |center]]
Pickering served as executive director of the Mississippi Veterans Affairs Board (MSVA) from 2018 to 2022.  In May 2022, MSVA issued a press release stating that Pickering and his chief of staff were both resigning. Following the press release, WLBT News reported that Pickering resigned because he had an unprofessional relationship with his chief of staff. WLBT also alleged abuse of state time and alluded to a possible criminal probe. Subsequent analysis raised "significant questions about how the agency operated under Pickering, a former state auditor and legislator, and the workplace culture he cultivated."

Personal 

He serves on the board of the Pine Burr Area Council of the Boy Scouts of America.

References

External links
 https://web.archive.org/web/20100712143715/http://www.osa.state.ms.us/index.htm

|-

1968 births
21st-century American politicians
Baptists from Mississippi
Jones County Junior College alumni
Living people
Republican Party Mississippi state senators
New Orleans Baptist Theological Seminary alumni
People from Laurel, Mississippi
Military personnel from Mississippi
Samford University alumni
State Auditors of Mississippi